Jira Payne was a Michigan politician.

Career
Payne was the owner of Atlas sawmill. On November 6, 1837, Payne was elected to the Michigan House of Representatives where he represented the Lenawee County district from January 1, 1838 to April 6, 1838. During his time in the legislature, Payne served on three committees: Internal Improvement, Banks and Incorporations, and Library.

Pomeroy Hall
In 1840, Payne built a Greek Revival house known as the Pomeroy Hall. The house served as a social center for Payne's residence of Clinton, Michigan. In 1988, the house was listed as a Michigan State Historic Site.

References

Year of birth missing
Year of death missing
Members of the Michigan House of Representatives
People from Lenawee County, Michigan
19th-century American politicians